The Dr. J.C. Francis Office is a historic building in Jacksonville, Alabama. It was built in 1852 as a medical practice for Dr. J.C. Francis, and designed in the American National style. Francis was born in Ray County, Tennessee and trained in Lexington, Kentucky before moving to Alabama. The building has been listed on the National Register of Historic Places since November 20, 1970.

References

National Register of Historic Places in Calhoun County, Alabama
Buildings and structures completed in 1852
1852 establishments in Alabama